Bob Liggett (born December 8, 1946) is a former American football defensive tackle. He played for the Kansas City Chiefs in 1970 and for the BC Lions in 1971.

References

1946 births
Living people
American football defensive tackles
Nebraska Cornhuskers football players
Kansas City Chiefs players
BC Lions players